They Kiss Again is a 2007 Taiwanese television series starring Joe Cheng, Ariel Lin, Jiro Wang and Danson Tang. It is the sequel to It Started with a Kiss which is based on the Japanese manga series Itazura na Kiss (イタズラなKiss, Mischievous Kiss) written by Kaoru Tada. It was produced by Comic International Productions (可米國際影視事業股份有限公司) and directed by Chu Yu-ning (瞿友寧). It started filming 26 March 2007 and wrapped 19 January 2008.

It was first broadcast in Taiwan on free-to-air China Television (CTV) from 16 December 2007 to 27 April 2008, every Sunday at 22:00 to 23:30 and cable TV Gala Television (GTV) Variety Show/CH 28 on 22 December 2007 to 3 May 2008, every Saturday at 21:30 to 23:00.

It is the third live-action television adaptation following the Japanese adaptation also titled Itazura na Kiss, its prequel It Started with a Kiss in 2005 and followed by a South Korean adaptation Playful Kiss in 2010 broadcast on MBC.

Synopsis 
It Started with a Kiss ended with odd couple Zhi Shu (Joe Cheng) and Xiang Qin (Ariel Lin) getting married in characteristically comical fashion, and the sequel picks up the story with their honeymoon and married life. Xiang Qin is as ham-fisted as ever, creating many funny situations as she learns the ropes of being a wife and tries hard to become a good nurse and work alongside her genius husband. Aspiring doctor Zhi Shu meets some obstacles at school when he encounters both academic and romantic rivals who are determined to over-rule him.

As Zhi Shu and Xiang Qin struggle with their professional ambitions, they also struggle with their personal relationship. Many times, Zhi Shu's coldness and harshness drives Xiang Qin to tears and she tries to run away. Zhi Shu learns to understand and deal with his jealousy when Xiang Qin's nursing fellow student Yang Qi Tai (Figaro Ceng) becomes too close. He also tries to push Xiang Qin to higher ambition and independence. Zhi Shu soon learns to love Xiang Qin and forgive her bumbling ways, and Xiang Qin tries harder to become a better wife and nurse to her husband.

Zhi Shu and Xiang Qin are not the only ones having problems with their relationship. Xiang Qin's childhood friend Ah Jin (Jiro Wang) deals with the unwelcome affections of Christine (Larisa Bakurova), an English exchange student who latches onto him against his will. Xiang Qin's friend, Chun Mei (Petty Yang), gets pregnant by her boyfriend, Ah Bu (Aaron Yan), but his wealthy, highbrow mother is desperate to keep them apart. Zhi Shu's younger brother Yu Shu (Zhang Bo Han) deals with his own first love and their story remarkably resembles that of Zhi Shu and Xiang Qin.

Cast

Main cast
 Ariel Lin as Yuan Xiang Qin (袁湘琴) - Kotoko Aihara in the manga and Jiang Zhi Shu's wife
 Joe Cheng as Jiang Zhi Shu (江直樹) - Naoki Irie in the manga and Yuan Xiang Qin's husband
 Jiro Wang as Jin Yuan Feng (aka Ah Jin) (金元豐) - Kinnosuke Ikezawa in the manga and Yuan Xiang Qin's friend

Supporting cast
 Chang Yung Cheng as Jiang Wan Li (aka Ah Li) (江萬利) - Zhi Shu's father
 Cyndi Chaw as Jiang Zhao Zi (aka Ah Li's wife) (阿利嫂) - Zhi Shu's mother
 Tang Tsung Sheng as Yuan Cai (Ah Cai) (袁有才) - Xiang Qin's father
 Zhang Bo Han as Jiang Yu Shu (江裕樹) - Zhi Shu's brother
 Petty Yang as Lin Chun Mei (林純美) - Xiang Qin's best friend
 Candice Liu as Liu Ya Nong (劉雅儂) - Xiang Qin's best friend
 Ann Hsu as Pei Zi Yu (裴子瑜) - Zhi Shu's friend
 Jason Wang as Wang Hao Qian (王皓謙) - Zhi Shu's college friend
 Aaron Yan as Ah Bu (阿布) - Chun Mei's boyfriend

Extended cast

Danson Tang (唐禹哲) as Ouyang Gan (歐陽幹)
Billie Wang as Ah Bu (阿布)'s mother
Guan Cong (關聰) as Zhi Shu (直樹)'s grandfather
Senda Aisa (千田愛紗) as Mary (瑪麗)
Kitamura Toyoharu as Qing Yu (青宇)
Gu Xuan Chun as Ah Qiao (阿巧)
Jason as Wang Hao Qian (王皓謙)
Ma Nian Xian (馬念先) as Du Ze Sen (杜澤森)
Wang Zi (邱勝翊 / 王子) as Ah Nuo (阿諾) / Nobu
Guan Jia Yun (關嘉芸) as Zhang Jun Ya (張君雅)
Joelle Lu (陸明君) as Jun Ya (君雅)'s mother
Zhu De Gang (朱德剛) as Zhang Xi Hen (張熙恆)
Lin Yu Feng (林裕豐) as Xiang Qin's uncle

Hu Pei Ying (胡珮瑩) as Zhao Qing Shui (趙清水)
Figaro Ceng (曾少宗) as Yang Qi Tai (楊啟太)
Cai Yi Zhen as Luo Zhi Yi (羅智儀)
Jiang Pei Zhen (江佩珍) as Zhang Ni Na (章妮娜)
Xiu Jie Kai (修杰楷) as Zhou Chuan Jin (周傳津)
Li Er (黎兒/粼筱蓉) as Xu Qiu Xian (許秋賢)
Lin Jia Yu (林珈妤) as childhood Lin Hao Mei (林好美)
Summer Meng (孟耿如) as teenage Lin Hao Mei (林好美)
Cong Yang (崇洋) as teenage Jiang Yu Shu (江裕樹)
Larisa Bakurova (瑞莎) as Christine Robinson (克莉斯汀)
Joe Cheng (鄭元暢) as Alvin—Christine's Fiancé
Liu Rong Jia (劉容嘉) as Liu Nong (流濃)
Ken Zhong as Li Shu Ning (李述宁)

Soundtrack

They Kiss Again Original Soundtrack (惡作劇2吻電視原聲) was released on December 28, 2007, by various artists under Avex Taiwan. It contains eleven songs, in which three of them are instrumental versions of some songs. The opening theme song is "Xing Fu He Zhuo She" or "Happiness Cooperative" by Mavis Fan, while the ending theme song is by Ariel Lin entitled "Ni" or "You".

Track listing

Awards and nominations

See also
 Itazura na Kiss: The original manga version of the novel
 It Started with a Kiss: prequel of the Taiwanese television drama adaptation
 Playful Kiss: Korean TV drama adaptation
 Mischievous Kiss: Love in Tokyo: Japanese series adaptation of the manga 2013 remake
 Race the World: 2016 Chinese reality show, Lin and Cheng paired up and won the competition

References

External links 
 CTV They Kiss Again official homepage
 GTV They Kiss Again official homepage

China Television original programming
Gala Television original programming
2007 Taiwanese television series debuts
2008 Taiwanese television series endings
Taiwanese television dramas based on manga
Itazura na Kiss
Sequel television series